Jacques Dicker (1879, Khotyn, Bessarabia – 17 November 1942, Geneva) was a Ukrainian-born Swiss socialist politician and lawyer.

Dicker was born in a wealthy Jewish family. His father, Moises, worked as a superintendent. Dicker took up Law studies in Kiev. He joined the Socialist-Revolutionary Party as a young man. He was jailed and imprisoned several times due to his political activism. He migrated to Switzerland in 1906, fleeing the Czarist repression in the Russian empire. He continued his Law studies in his new homeland. He obtained his degree in 1909 and was admitted to the bar in 1915. He would become a prominent penal lawyer.

Dicker became a Swiss citizen in 1915. In Swiss politics, Dicker emerged as a prominent leader of the Socialist Party in Geneva. He collaborated with Léon Nicole at the newspaper Le Travail. Between 1922 and 1925, Dicker represented Geneva in the National Council. He returned to the National Council in 1928, and would remain a member of that body until 1941. Dicker defended Nicole in a legal case in May 1933.

Being a prominent Jewish political leader, Dicker was subjected to violent antisemitic attacks. On 9 November 1932 the far-right National Union convened a meeting in the municipal hall in Plainpalais, a meeting intended to function as a tribunal against Nicole and Dicker. A leftist countermanifestation was organized. Violence broke out between demonstrators and army, killing 13 people and injuring 65.

Dicker was one of four Socialist parliamentarians that sided with the Swiss Socialist Federation when the Socialist Party went through a split in 1939. The Swiss Socialist Federation was banned on 27 May 1941 and Dicker and the other parliamentarians of the party were expelled from the National Council on 11–12 June 1941.

References

20th-century Swiss lawyers
Emigrants from the Russian Empire to Switzerland
1879 births
1942 deaths
People from Khotyn
Ukrainian Jews
Swiss Jews
20th-century Swiss politicians